Some terms used for the feathers of poultry are identical to those used for feathers of other birds, while others are specific to poultry. They include:

See also
 Bird anatomy
 Feather
 Flight feather
 List of chicken colours

References

Poultry
Chickens
Feathers